Aleksei Aleksandrovich Krasnokutskiy (born 11 March 1986) is a Russian professional football coach and a former player. He works as a goalkeepers coach with FC Novosibirsk.

Club career
He played 4 seasons in the Russian Football National League for FC Irtysh Omsk and FC Shinnik Yaroslavl.

Honours
 Russian Second Division, Zone East best goalkeeper: 2009.

References

External links
 
 

1986 births
Living people
Russian footballers
Association football goalkeepers
FC Sibir Novosibirsk players
FC Shinnik Yaroslavl players
FC Irtysh Omsk players
FC Zhemchuzhina Sochi players